Shock SuspenStories was part of the EC Comics line in the early 1950s. The bi-monthly comic, published by Bill Gaines and edited by Al Feldstein, began with issue 1 in February/March 1952. Over a four-year span, it ran for 18 issues, ending with the December/January 1955 issue.

Artists and writers 
Front covers were by Feldstein, Wally Wood, Johnny Craig, George Evans and Jack Kamen. Kamen was the comic's most prolific artist, usually doing the lead eight-page story in each issue. Other stories were illustrated by Craig, Evans, Wood, Graham Ingels, Jack Davis, Al Williamson, Joe Orlando, Reed Crandall, Bernard Krigstein and Frank Frazetta. Writing was handled by Gaines and Feldstein exclusively through the first 12 issues with the exception of a single story written by Craig. Over the last 6 issues other writers who contributed included Carl Wessler, Otto Binder, and Jack Oleck.

Issue 13 featured "Squeeze Play", the only solo story Frank Frazetta drew for EC.

Origin and major themes 
Shock SuspenStories originated in early 1952 as a "sampler" featuring stories of various genres.  Gaines and Feldstein explained the comic's origin and the source of its title in the first issue:
We've tried to satisfy every one of you readers who have written us insisting that EC increase its output! Many of you wanted another science-fiction mag... you horror fans wanted another horror book... and you suspense readers wanted a companion mag to Crime SuspenStories!  We decided, therefore, to make this new mag an "EC Sampler" ...and to include in it an S-F yarn, a horror tale, a Crime SuspenStory, and... for you readers of Frontline Combat and Two-Fisted Tales... a war story!  Although there was a wide variance in the types of mags requested, all of you fans seemed to agree on one thing: all of you wanted the stories to have the usual EC shock endings!  So what could be more natural than to call the magazine Shock SuspenStories?

The war story would be immediately phased out with the second issue, replaced with a message story – the "Shock SuspenStory". Bhob Stewart discussed the "Shock SuspenStory" in his notes for the EC Library, which reprinted all 18 issues of this title:
It was evident from the cover of #2 that Gaines had conceived this title for matters of deeper concern. With "The Patriots", the "Shock SuspenStory" was born. And far from being just a label of meaningless hype, the concept proved to be a major step for EC, providing Gaines and Feldstein with a forum for expressing their views on the human condition just as Two-Fisted Tales and Frontline Combat were for Harvey Kurtzman. The Shock SuspenStory was characterized by a running theme of mob violence and an art style best described as Heightened Realism. A similarity can be noted between Wood's dramatically effective Shock renderings and the caricatures of corruption in the acclaimed fine art of Jack Levine.

Over the next three years Shock SuspenStories tackled many controversial issues, including racism ("The Guilty" in #3, "In Gratitude" in #11), mob hysteria ("The Patriots" in #2), police corruption ("Confession" in #4), vigilantism ("Under Cover" in #6), drug addiction ("The Monkey" in #12) and rape ("The Assault" in #8, "A Kind of Justice" in #16). The sampler format remained for the remaining three stories in the title until the end of 1953. With #12, the horror and science fiction stories were phased out, and the comic then focused primarily on shock and crime stories for the remainder of its run.

Influences and adaptations 
As with the other EC comics edited by Feldstein, the stories in this comic were primarily based on Gaines reading a large number of suspense stories and using them to develop "springboards" from which he and Feldstein could launch new stories. Specific story influences that have been identified include the following:

"Just Desserts!" (issue 3) - Ray Bradbury's "The Smiling People"
"Dead Right!" (issue 6) - John Collier's "In the Cards!"
"Under Cover!" (issue 6) - Roald Dahl's "Beware of the Dog"
"Seep No More!" (issue 8) - Edgar Allan Poe's "The Tell-Tale Heart"
"Fall Guy" (issue 12) - Maurice Level's "The Debt Collector"
"You, Murderer" (issue 14) - Robert Wiene's The Cabinet of Dr. Caligari

Anecdotes from Bennett Cerf's Try and Stop Me were sources for stories, including "Yellow" (issue 1) and "The Patriots" (issue 2).

After their unauthorized adaptation of one of Ray Bradbury's stories in another magazine, Bradbury contacted EC about their plagiarism of his work. They reached an agreement for EC to do authorized versions of Bradbury's short fiction.  These official adaptations include:

"The Small Assassin" (issue 7)
"The October Game" (issue 9)

Controversies and demise
Issue #14 contained two of the title's most controversial stories, "The Orphan", which featured a ten-year-old girl murdering her father and framing her mother, and "The Whipping" which featured a bigoted father mistakenly beating his daughter to death under the impression that she was her Hispanic boyfriend. Gaines was questioned extensively about both stories by the Senate Subcommittee to Investigate Juvenile Delinquency in April 1954.

Shock SuspenStories was one of five comics voluntarily discontinued by publisher Bill Gaines in 1955 in response to the outcry over horror and crime comics.

Reprints
Shock SuspenStories has been reprinted numerous times over the years. Ballantine Books reprinted selected stories in a series of paperback EC anthologies in 1964–1966. The magazine was fully reprinted in a series of three black-and-white hardbacks by publisher Russ Cochran as part of The Complete EC Library in 1981. Between September 1992 and December 1996, Cochran (in association with Gemstone Publishing) reprinted the full 18 individual issues.  This complete run was later rebound, with covers included, in a series of four softcover EC Annuals.  In 2006, Cochran and Gemstone began to publish hardcover, re-colored volumes of Shock SuspenStories as part of the EC Archives series.  Two volumes (of a projected three) were published before Gemstone's financial troubles left the project in limbo.  GC Press LLC, a boutique imprint established by Russ Cochran and Grant Geissman, announced in a press release dated September 1, 2011 that it was continuing the EC Archives series, with the first new releases scheduled for November.
Dark Horse Comics have subsequently published both Shock Suspenstories EC Archives volume 1 and volume 3 (published in April 2015)

Issue guide

Sources

Comics magazines published in the United States
Comics by Carl Wessler
Crime comics
EC Comics publications
Tales from the Crypt
1952 comics debuts
1955 comics endings
Magazines established in 1952
Magazines disestablished in 1955
Horror comics
Mystery comics